Truth Be Told, known during production as People Are Talking, is an American sitcom television series created by D. J. Nash and executive produced by D. J. Nash and Will Packer for Universal Television. The NBC series debuted on October 16, 2015. It was revealed on December 10, 2015, that NBC had "quietly cancelled" Truth Be Told, as the sets had been struck and lead actor Tone Bell had been cast in another series. The final two episodes were burned off on December 25, 2015.

Synopsis
The series revolves around two diverse couples, who are best friends and neighbors. They share their observations about the world around them. The show centers around Mitch, a college ethics professor who is determined to change the part of the world he lives in today. Alongside Mitch is his wife of five years, Tracy, who is also an attorney and loving mom to their five-year-old daughter, Sadie. Right next door is Mitch's best friend, Russell, a stand-up comedian and often Mitch's voice of reason, and Russell's new wife Angie, a doctor, who always keeps him in check. The show is loosely based on the life of creator and executive producer D. J. Nash.

Cast and characters
Main cast
Mark-Paul Gosselaar as Mitch
Tone Bell as Russell
Vanessa Lachey as Tracy
Bresha Webb as Angie

Recurring cast
Alex Jayne Go as Sadie (episodes 1, 2, 5) 
Sophie Mackenzie Nack as Sadie (episodes (3, 4, 6–10) 

Melanie Paxson as Linda, Tracy's assistant at work

Production
The pilot was picked up to series by NBC on May 7, 2015 On July 27, 2015, NBC changed the title of the series from People are Talking to Truth Be Told. NBC reduced the season order from 13 episodes to 10 episodes on October 27, 2015.

Reception
The show received generally negative reviews from critics. On Metacritic, it holds a score of 26/100 based on 20 reviews indicating "generally unfavorable reviews". On Rotten Tomatoes, it has a 15% approval rating based on 34 reviews, with an average rating of 3.33/10. The website's critics' consensus reads: "Truth Be Told wants to be topically edgy, but only sends viewers on a bland descent into a world of unfunny and grating sitcom characters."

Episodes

References

External links

2010s American sitcoms
2015 American television series debuts
2015 American television series endings
English-language television shows
NBC original programming
Television series by Universal Television
Will Packer Productions television shows